Murphy Lake is a lake in Marinette County, Wisconsin. Murphy Lake lies at an elevation of 719 feet (225 m).  The lake contains panfish, largemouth bass, northern pike, and trout. It has a public boat access ramp.

References

Lakes of Wisconsin
Bodies of water of Marinette County, Wisconsin